This is a list of avant-garde and experimental films released in the 1970s.

Notes

1970s
Avant-garde